Nariko Enomoto (榎本ナリコ) (born 1967) is a Japanese manga author and manga critic who uses this name for children's and women's magazines. She writes under the name  for Boys Love and doujinshi, and for critical works. She won a special award in the Sense of Gender Awards in 2003 with her work .

Works

As Nariko Enomoto
 
 
  (adaptation of story by Natsume Sōseki)

References

External links
 Official site 
 

Living people
1967 births
20th-century Japanese women artists
Manga artists from Tokyo
Japanese female comics artists
Women manga artists
Female comics writers
Japanese women writers
Japanese writers